The 2021–22 Liga Nacional de Guatemala season is the 24th season of the Liga Nacional de Guatemala, the top football league in Guatemala, in which the Apertura and Clausura season is used. The season will begin in August 2021 and will end in May 2022.

Team Information
A total of 12 teams will contest the league, including 10 sides from the 2020–21 Guatemala Liga Nacional and 2 promoted from the 2020–21 Primera División.

Sacachispas and Sanarate were relegated to 2020–21 Primera División the previous season.

The relegated team were replaced by the 2020–21 Primera División winners Nueva Concepción and Sololá.

Promotion and relegation 

Promoted from Primera División de Ascenso as of August 2021.

 Nueva Concepción and Sololá

Relegated to Primera División de Ascenso as of August 2021.

 Sanarate and Sacachispas

Personnel and sponsoring

Managerial Changes

Beginning of the season

During the Apertura season

Pre-Clausura changes

During the Clausura season

Apertura

League table

Championship Playoffs
Qualified teams
 Antigua
 Comunicaciones
 Municipal
 Malacateco
 Santa Lucía
 Xelajú
 Iztapa
 Sololá

Final

First leg

Second leg

Clausura

League table

Championship Playoffs
Qualified teams
 Comunicaciones
 Municipal
 Antigua
 Malacateco
 Cobán Imperial
 Guastatoya
 Achuapa
 Santa Lucía

Final

First leg

Second leg

Aggregate table

List of Foreign Players
This is a list of foreign players in 2021-2022 season. The following players:
have played at least one apertura game for the respective club.
have not been capped for the Guatemala national football team on any level, independently from the birthplace.  

A new rule was introduced a few season ago, that clubs can only have five foreign players per club and can only add a new player if there is an injury or player/s is released.

Achuapa
  Álvaro García
  Orlando Osorio
  Roberto Nurse
  Jorge Gatgens
  Julián Cardozo

Antigua
  Antonio López
  José Mena
  Alexander Robinson
  Juan Yax
  Santos Crisanto
  Julio García
  Romario da Silva
  Pedro Báez
  Deyner Padilla

Cobán Imperial
  Janderson
  Aaron Navarro
  Minor Álvarez
  Angel Díaz
  Esteban Espíndola
  Hernan Gustavo Fener
  Javier Colli
  Nicolas Pietrani

Comunicaciones  
  Karel Espino
  Andrés Lezcano
  Alexander Larín
  Kevin López
  Juan Anangonó
  José Ayoví
  Jose Corena
  Manuel Gamboa

Guastatoya
  Adrián de Lemos
  Luis Landín
  Omar Dominguez
  Nicolás Martínez
  Matías Galvaliz

Iztapa
  Nicolás Foglia
  Christian Hernández
  Gianluca Conforti
  Carlos Kamiani Felix
  Jordan Smith
  Manfred Russell
  Anllel Porras

Malacateco
  Darío Silva
  Enzo Herrera x
  Elmer Morales
  Kenneth Cerdas
  Lucas Ventura
  Diego Avila

Municipal 
  Milciades Portillo
  Matías Rotondi
  Steve Makuka
  Jaime Alas
  Yasnier Matos
  Jesús Isijara

Nueva Concepción
  Aelcio dos Santos
  Jonathan Muñoz
  Jhon Balanta
  Bruno Mariani
  Leandro Martin
  Darío Carreño

Santa Lucía
  Thales Moreira
  Charles Martínez
  Isaac Acuna
  Omar Morales
  Juan Osorio
  Facundo Aranda

Sololá
  Víctor Bolivar
  Camilo Nassi
  Facundo Tancredi
  Juan Gutiérrez
  Marco Morgon
  Elieser Quinones

Xelajú
  Rafael García
  Orlando Moreira
  Juan Barrera
  Alejandro Díaz
  Jesús Arrieta

External links
 https://lared.com.gt/deportes/futbol/liga-nacional/
 https://www.guatevision.com/etiqueta/futbol-guatemala/

Liga Nacional de Fútbol de Guatemala seasons
1
Guatemala